Richard J. Pearce (February 29, 1836 – September 18, 1908) known as Dickey Pearce was an American professional baseball player and one of the sport's most famous early figures.  He was born in Brooklyn, New York, and began playing with the Brooklyn Atlantics in 1857. He continued his career in the National Association and the early years of Major League Baseball. It is possible Pearce was one of the first baseball players to earn money for playing the game professionally. Pearce is given credit for pioneering the shortstop position. Pearce introduced his "tricky hit" to baseball, known today as the bunt. For much of his career, the rules permitted the ball to roll foul and still be a hit.

Pearce played professionally for 22 years, spanning the generation from the game's beginnings to the National League. In the June 30, 1868 edition of the St. Louis Times, the paper said of him: "Pearce has been noted as a superior shortstop for ten years and to-day has no equal in the base ball field. He bats with great judgment and safety..." After retiring from playing, Pearce umpired into the mid-1880s.

References

External links

Major League Baseball shortstops
Brooklyn Atlantics (NABBP) players
Brooklyn Excelsiors players
New York Mutuals players
New York Mutuals managers
Brooklyn Atlantics players
St. Louis Brown Stockings (NA) players
St. Louis Brown Stockings players
Baseball player-managers
19th-century baseball players
1836 births
1908 deaths
Ludlow (minor league baseball) players
Rhode Islands players
Quincy Quincys players
Baseball players from New York (state)
St. Louis Brown Stockings managers